Gérard Guercy (16 April 1925 – 30 May 2009) was an Algerian racing cyclist. He rode in the 1952 Tour de France.

References

External links
 

1925 births
2009 deaths
Algerian male cyclists
Place of birth missing
21st-century Algerian people